Louisa, 2nd Countess of Mansfield (born The Hon. Louisa Cathcart; 1758 – 11 July 1843), was a Scottish noblewoman, who was married twice: first to David Murray, 2nd Earl of Mansfield, and then to The Hon. Robert Fulke Greville.

Louisa was the daughter of Charles Cathcart, 9th Lord Cathcart, and his wife, the former Jane Hamilton. She was baptised on 1 July 1758 at Alloa.

On 5 May 1776, Louisa married Scottish peer David Murray, then Viscount Stormont. Thus she was known as the Viscountess Stormont. It was the viscount's second marriage, and he was thirty years older than Louisa. Their five children were:
 David William Murray, 3rd Earl of Mansfield (1777–1840)
 Lieutenant-general The Hon. George Murray (1780–1848)
 Major The Hon. Charles Murray (1781–1859), who married Elizabeth Law and had children
 General Sir Henry Murray (1784–1860), who married Emily, daughter of Gerard de Vismé, and had children.
 Lady Caroline Murray (died 1867)

The family seat was Scone Palace, but the viscount was the British ambassador in Paris, where Madame du Deffand commented that his new wife "is pretty, she holds herself badly, and has not a charming manner, but her expression is full of intelligence". Improvements to Scone Palace were worked on by George Paterson until 1783, when the house was considered suitable as a regular residence.

In 1776, Lord Stormont's uncle, William Murray, 1st Baron Mansfield was created Earl of Mansfield.  He had no children of his own and so the title was created with a remainder to Louisa and her issue with Lord Stormont. The Complete Peerage notes: "The strange limitation of the Earldom in 1776 was doubtless owing to a notion then prevalent that no British peerage granted even in remainder to a Scottish peer would enable such peer to sit in Parliament. This was founded on the absurd resolution passed by the House of Lords in 1711 as to the like impotency of a British peerage granted to a peer of Scotland, which resolution was rescinded in 1782. Accordingly, in 1792, the limitation of the Earldom was made with a direct remainder to the grantee's nephew, though a peer of Scotland." Thus when her husband died in 1796, their son inherited the second creation. Louisa outlived her son and on her own death in 1843, the first creation was inherited by her grandson, William, the 4th earl.

At the time of her first husband's death, Louisa was still in her thirties. She married again, this time to her first cousin, Lieutenant-Colonel The Hon. Robert Fulke Greville (a younger son of Francis Greville, 1st Earl of Warwick), on 19 October 1797, at St Marylebone Parish Church. By her second husband she had a further three children:
 Lady Georgiana Greville (1798–1871), who married General Sir George Cathcart and had children
 Lady Louisa Greville (1800–1883), who married The Rev. Daniel Heneage Finch-Hatton and had children
 The Hon. Robert Fulke Greville (1800–1867)

The countess's portrait was painted by George Romney. She died on 11 July 1843 and was buried in her second husband's family tomb in the chapter house at St Mary's, Warwick.

References

1758 births
1843 deaths
British countesses
2
Daughters of barons
Peerage of Scotland
18th-century Scottish people
18th-century Scottish women
19th-century Scottish people
19th-century Scottish women
Hereditary women peers
Stormont
Earls in the Peerage of Great Britain